André Delattre (27 December 1931 – 4 February 2014) was a French politician who served as a member of the National Assembly from 1988 to 1993.

References

1931 births
2014 deaths
People from Nord (French department)
Politicians from Hauts-de-France
Socialist Party (France) politicians
Deputies of the 9th National Assembly of the French Fifth Republic